Monkwood is a Hamlet in the south of Ropley parish. Although currently it is spread between Petersfield Road and Hill Farm Road, historically it referred to the settlement on the south side of Smugglers Lane (SU 6605630920) containing the 15th Century Smugglers, the 16th Century The Old Farmhouse and the C18th century cottage between the two. The more recent settlement between Petersfield Road and Hill Farm Lane originates from around the late 1800s, with only two settlements; Hill Farm and Ropley Common Farm visible in the 1870s OS Map.

Etymology
The first mention of Monkwood is not yet known however as the name suggests there is a monastical connection. The Woodland specifically referred to is preserved in the 1839 Ropley Parish Tithe Map which lists a series of names focused around the junction of Smugglers Lane and Petersfield Road (SU6595131170);

References

External links

Villages in Hampshire